Promise Me This ( / Zavet) is a film written and directed by the award-winning Serbian filmmaker Emir Kusturica.  The film screened on May 26, 2007 at the 60th annual Cannes Film Festival.  The international title of the film is Promise Me This, but the film is known as Zavet ("the testament") in Serbian.

Plot
Set in Zlatibor District, an old man named Živojin Marković (Aleksandar Berček), living in a remote village prays for his grandson Tsane (Uroš Milovanović) to go to the city (Užice), sell his cow and bring back a wife.
In the city he is supposed to meet up with his grandfather's stepbrother, but this man is dead. Instead, he meets this man's two grandsons, two good-natured brothers who are nevertheless small-time criminals and experts in demolition. Tsane soon clicks with these men, and also falls in love with a schoolgirl (Jasna, played by Marija Petronijević), who he wants to marry as part of his testament with his grandfather (the other parts of the testament are to bring back an icon and a souvenir, which he should buy with the money he gets from selling the cow). He gets involved in this girl's family affairs, rescuing both her and her mother from prostitution and gangsters headed by a man called Bajo (Miki Manojlović), and the new group of people return to the small village in time to celebrate Živojin's wedding to his neighbor, despite the gangsters' best efforts to stop the celebration, which results in a double wedding.

Cast
 Uroš Milovanović
 Marija Petronijević
 Miki Manojlović
 Aleksandar Berček
 Ljiljana Blagojević
 Stribor Kusturica

References

External links
 
 Promise Me This Preview at Kustu.com

2007 films
Films directed by Emir Kusturica
2000s Serbian-language films
Serbian comedy films
2007 comedy films